Thermogenin (called uncoupling protein by its discoverers and now known as uncoupling protein 1, or UCP1) is a mitochondrial carrier protein found in brown adipose tissue (BAT). It is used to generate heat by non-shivering thermogenesis, and makes a quantitatively important contribution to countering heat loss in babies which would otherwise occur due to their high surface area-volume ratio.

Mechanism

UCP1 belongs to the UCP family which are transmembrane proteins that decrease the proton gradient generated in oxidative phosphorylation. They do this by increasing the permeability of the inner mitochondrial membrane, allowing protons that have been pumped into the intermembrane space to return to the mitochondrial matrix. UCP1-mediated heat generation in brown fat uncouples the respiratory chain, allowing for fast substrate oxidation with a low rate of ATP production. UCP1 is related to other mitochondrial metabolite transporters such as the adenine nucleotide translocator, a proton channel in the mitochondrial inner membrane that permits the translocation of protons from the mitochondrial intermembrane space to the mitochondrial matrix. UCP1 is restricted to brown adipose tissue, where it provides a mechanism for the enormous heat-generating capacity of the tissue.

UCP1 is activated in the brown fat cell by fatty acids and inhibited by nucleotides. Fatty acids are released by the following signaling cascade: Sympathetic nervous system terminals release Norepinephrine onto a Beta-3 adrenergic receptor on the plasma membrane. This activates adenylyl cyclase, which catalyses the conversion of ATP to cyclic AMP (cAMP). cAMP activates protein kinase A, causing its active C subunits to be freed from its regulatory R subunits. Active protein kinase A, in turn, phosphorylates triacylglycerol lipase, thereby activating it. The lipase converts triacylglycerols into free fatty acids, which activate UCP1, overriding the inhibition caused by purine nucleotides (GDP and ADP). During the termination of thermogenesis, thermogenin is inactivated and residual fatty acids are disposed of through oxidation, allowing the cell to resume its normal energy-conserving state.

UCP1 is very similar to the ATP/ADP Carrier protein, or Adenine Nucleotide Translocator (ANT). The proposed alternating access model for UCP1 is based on the similar ANT mechanism. The substrate comes in to the half open UCP1 protein from the cytoplasmic side of the membrane, the protein closes the cytoplasmic side so the substrate is enclosed in the protein, and then the matrix side of the protein opens, allowing the substrate to be released into the mitochondrial matrix. The opening and closing of the protein is accomplished by the tightening and loosening of salt bridges at the membrane surface of the protein. Substantiation for this modelling of UCP1 on ANT is found in the many conserved residues between the two proteins that are actively involved in the transportation of substrate across the membrane. Both proteins are integral membrane proteins, localized to the inner mitochondrial membrane, and they have a similar pattern of salt bridges, proline residues, and hydrophobic or aromatic amino acids that can close or open when in the cytoplasmic or matrix state.

Evolution
UCP1 is expressed in brown adipose tissue, which is functionally found only in eutherians. The UCP1, or thermogenin, gene likely arose in an ancestor of modern vertebrates, but did not initially allow for our vertebrate ancestor to use non-shivering thermogenesis for warmth. It wasn't until heat generation was adaptively selected for in placental mammal descendants of this common ancestor that UCP1 evolved its current function in brown adipose tissue to provide additional warmth. While UCP1 plays a key thermogenic role in wide range placental mammals, particularly those with small body size and those that hibernate, the UCP1 gene has lost functionality in several large-bodied lineages (e.g. horses, elephants, sea cows, whales and hyraxes) and lineages with low metabolic rates (e.g. pangolins, armadillos, sloths and anteaters). Recent discoveries of non-heat-generating orthologues of UCP1 in fish and marsupials, other descendants of the ancestor of modern vertebrates, show that this gene was passed on to all modern vertebrates, but aside from placental mammals, none have heat producing capability. This further suggests that UCP1 had a different original purpose and in fact phylogenetic and sequence analyses indicate that UCP1 is likely a mutated form of a dicarboxylate carrier protein that adapted for thermogenesis in placental mammals.

History
Researchers in the 1960s investigating brown adipose tissue, found that in addition to producing more heat than typical of other tissues, brown adipose tissue seemed to short circuit, or uncouple, respiration coupling. Uncoupling protein 1 was discovered in 1976 by David G. Nicholls, Vibeke Bernson, and Gillian Heaton, and the discovery was published in 1978 and shown to be the protein responsible for this uncoupling effect. UCP1 was later purified for the first time in 1980 and was first cloned in 1988.

Uncoupling protein two (UCP2), a homolog of UCP1, was identified in 1997. UCP2 localizes to a wide variety of tissues, and is thought to be involved in regulating reactive oxygen species (ROS). In the past decade, three additional homologs of UCP1 have been identified, including UCP3, UCP4, and UCP5 (also known as BMCP1 or SLC25A14).

Clinical relevance 
Methods of delivering UCP1 to cells by gene transfer therapy or methods of its upregulation have been an important line of enquiry in research into the treatment of obesity, due to their ability to dissipate excess metabolic stores.

See also 
 2,4-Dinitrophenol (A synthetic small-molecule proton shuttle with similar effects)

References

Further reading

External links 
 Seaweed anti-obesity tablet hope (BBC - Thermogenin mentioned as part of process)
 

Cellular respiration
Mitochondria